Cimbex is a genus of sawflies in the family Cimbicidae.

Species
 Cimbex americanus Leach, 1817 – Elm sawfly
 Cimbex connatus (Schrank, 1776) 
 Cimbex fagi Zaddach, 1863 
 Cimbex femoratus (Linnaeus, 1758) – Birch sawfly
 Cimbex luteus (Linnaeus, 1761) 
 Cimbex pacificus Cresson, 1880 
 Cimbex quadrimaculatus (O. F. Müller, 1766)
 Cimbex rubidus Cresson, 1880 
 Cimbex semidea Cresson, 1880

Fossil record

This genus is known in the fossil record from the Eocene to the Miocene (from about 37.2 to recent). Fossils of species within this genus have been found in United States, Japan, and China.

References

External links
 Biolib
 Fauna Europaea

Tenthredinoidea